Skema may refer to :

 Skema Business School
 Antanas Škėma (1910–1961), Lithuanian writer